White Mission (Spanish: Misión blanca) is a 1946 Spanish drama film directed by Juan de Orduña and starring Manuel Luna, Jorge Mistral and Fernando Rey. The film was shot on location in Spanish Guinea and in a Spanish studio. The film's sets were designed by Sigfrido Burmann and Francisco Canet.

The film portrays a religious mission in the Spanish Empire.

Cast
 as Father Mauricio  
Gabriel Algara as Jiménez  
Marianela Barandalla as Diana  
Elva de Bethancourt as Souka  
Juan Espantaleón as Cesáreo Urgoiti  
Manuel Luna as Brisco  
 as Father Daniel  
Jorge Mistral as Minoa  
 as Father Suárez  
Julio Peña as Father Javier  
Fernando Rey as Carlos 
José Miguel Rupert as Souka's father 
Jesús Tordesillas as Father Urcola

References

External links

1946 drama films
Spanish drama films
Films directed by Juan de Orduña
Films scored by Juan Quintero Muñoz
Spanish black-and-white films
Equatoguinean drama films
1940s Spanish films